Old Newcastle East Public School is a heritage-listed former school building at 58 Bolton Street, Newcastle, City of Newcastle, New South Wales, Australia. It was designed by Walter Liberty Vernon and built from 1908 to 1912. It is also known as Newcastle Public School. It was added to the New South Wales State Heritage Register on 2 April 1999.

History 

The building housed the Newcastle East Public School until it moved to the former Newcastle Junior High School site in 1982. It was then used as an annexe to the Newcastle Court House across the street, serving as the Community Justice Centre.

It was sold by the Department of Attorney-General and Justice in March 2014, having become surplus to their needs due to the court house's move to a new building. It was subsequently developed as the Parque Newcastle East apartments, with the heritage-listed buildings adaptively reused and multi-storey apartments built on the unused parts of the site.

Description 

The Old Newcastle East Public School is designed in Vernon's typical federation Free Classical adopted school style. The building was designed as a substantial school classroom block with a hipped roof dominated by several tall chimneys. The bolton Street entrance is marked by a small gable roofed projecting entrance bay which features a stone capped parapet.

The building is constructed in face brick and features contrasting sandstone trim, abutments and string coursing. Original slate roofing material was replaced with tiles .

Heritage listing 
The Old Newcastle East Public School is of considerable historical, social and townscape significance being reputably the oldest continuously existing school in Australia until its closure. The substantial Federation Free style designed building is a good example of Vernon's work. It is prominently located on a corner site within the centre of Newcastle.

The Old Newcastle East Public School was listed on the New South Wales State Heritage Register on 2 April 1999.

See also

References

Attribution

External links

New South Wales State Heritage Register
Newcastle, New South Wales
Defunct schools in New South Wales
Articles incorporating text from the New South Wales State Heritage Register
Educational institutions established in 1906
1906 establishments in Australia
Educational institutions disestablished in 1982